Eastgulf is an unincorporated community in Raleigh County, West Virginia, United States.

Cornelius H. Charlton (1929-1951), United States Army soldier and recipient of the Congressional Medal of Honor, was born in Eastgulf.

References

Unincorporated communities in Raleigh County, West Virginia
Unincorporated communities in West Virginia
Coal towns in West Virginia